Henri Wallon may refer to:

Henri-Alexandre Wallon (1812–1904), French historian and statesman, grandfather of the following
Henri Wallon (psychologist) (1879–1962), French psychologist and politician, grandson of the preceding